Leiognathus equulus, the common ponyfish is a species of marine ray-finned fish, a ponyfish from the family Leiognathidae. It occurs in brackish and marine waters from East Africa to Fiji in the Indian and western Pacific Oceans, Red Sea and Persian Gulf.

References

External links
 Fishes of Australia : Leiognathus equulus

equulus
Bioluminescent fish
Marine fauna of East Africa
Marine fish of Northern Australia
common ponyfish
Taxa named by Peter Forsskål